Otog may refer to:

Otog Banner, in Inner Mongolia, China
Otog Front Banner, in Inner Mongolia, China